ConnectBot is an open-source Secure Shell client for the Android operating system.  It lets users securely log in remotely to servers that run a secure shell daemon.  This allows the user to enter commands from their Android device and have the commands run on the remote server instead of the local android device. It uses the standard encryption used by SSH2 to keep any commands and data that are transmitted from being eavesdropped by any potential listeners across the network.

Features
 It supports login with a username and password to any arbitrary server on the local network or internet
 Supports connections based on a public/private keypair instead of username/password for increased security
 Allows frequently accessed hosts to be saved in a menu, so that they can quickly be re-connected to

Once the connection has been made with the remote server, the program presents the user with a terminal where input and output can be sent/received just as if the user were sitting in front of a terminal on the actual server.

Reception
ConnectBot is the most popular Secure Shell client available for the Android operating system, with over 1,000,000 downloads and more than 43,000 ratings on Google Play with an average rating of 4.5/5.

Products based on ConnectBot
 Georgia SoftWorks (GSW) ConnectBot on Google Play. Adds commercial mass deployment features including network licensing, configuration from a MS Windows server, version updates from LAN, strong security algorithms not using SHA-1.
 VX ConnectBot on Google Play. Adds SCP file transfers, screenshots, export of private keys, tap and hold menus, X11 forwarding.

See also
 Comparison of SSH clients
 Secure Shell

External links
 Official website
 ConnectBot at Google Play
 
 Source code repository at GitHub
 Legacy development site at Google Code

Software reviews and tutorials
 AppBrain
 Video Tutorial
 Arbi Tutorial
 Android Police Tutorial
 Inwtx Tutorial

References
   
   
   

Free and open-source Android software
Secure Shell
Software using the Apache license
Free software programmed in Java (programming language)